Bob Veith (November 1, 1924 – March 29, 2006) was an American racecar driver.

Veith drove in the AAA and USAC Championship Car series, racing from 1955 to 1968 with 63 starts.  He finished in the top ten 37 times, with a best finish of 2nd twice, both in 1958.

Veith suffered bruises and abrasions in a practice crash at Daytona International Speedway on March 29, 1959.  He was saved by the roll bar when sliding upside down.  The accident was caused by the starter shaft, which had been left in the car.

Veith qualified for his first Indianapolis 500 in 1956, finishing 7th that year to win the Rookie of the Year award.  After another top 10 finish the next year, he qualified 4th in 1958 but was knocked out of the race in a first lap accident that killed Pat O'Connor.  He competed in the 500 eight more times, with his last start coming in 1968.

Indianapolis 500 results

World Championship career summary
The Indianapolis 500 was part of the FIA World Championship from 1950 through 1960. Drivers competing at Indy during those years were credited with World Championship points and participation. Bob Veith participated in 5 World Championship races but scored no World Championship points.

References

External links
1956 Indianapolis 500 Rookie Of The Year Veith Dies At 81

1924 births
2006 deaths
People from Tulare, California
Sportspeople from California
Racing drivers from California
Indianapolis 500 drivers
Indianapolis 500 Rookies of the Year
AAA Championship Car drivers
American racing drivers